Ancylolomia elisa is a moth in the family Crambidae. It was described by Graziano Bassi in 2013. It is found in Ghana.

References

Ancylolomia
Moths described in 2013
Moths of Africa
Lepidoptera of West Africa